The Mountain Creek Lake Bridge is a bridge in Dallas County, Texas.  The bridge is part of the North Texas Tollway Authority (NTTA) system.  It is tolled in both directions (toll is collected on the west end of the bridge), and the lanes of the Mountain Creek Lake Bridge toll plaza are equipped for electronic toll collection via TollTag.

The bridge connects Spur 303 between Grand Prairie and Dallas across Mountain Creek Lake.

References
Mountain Creek Lake Bridge (MCLB) - North Texas Tollway Authority

External links
North Texas Tollway Authority

Toll bridges in Texas
Buildings and structures in Dallas County, Texas
Bridges completed in 1979
Transportation in Dallas County, Texas
Road bridges in Texas
Transportation in the Dallas–Fort Worth metroplex
Girder bridges in the United States